"Afterglow" is a song by Australian rock band Taxiride, written by band members Jason Singh, Tim Wild, and Tim Watson. It was released on 10 February 2003 as the third and final single from their second studio album, Garage Mahal (July 2002). It reached No. 49 on the Australian ARIA Singles Chart.

Track listing

 Tracks 4 and 5 were recorded live at Club Quattro, Tokyo, on 24 October 2002.

Charts

References

2002 songs
2003 singles
Taxiride songs
Warner Music Group singles